Susan Africa (born August 20, 1959) is a veteran Filipino film, television and theatre actress.

Recognised as a legend in the Philippine cinema, Africa won "Best Supporting Actress" at the 13th Metro Manila Film Festival for her performance in 'Olongapo, The Great American Dream'. In 2016, she attended the 66th Berlin International Film Festival as part of the acclaimed 'Hele sa Hiwagang Hapis' where it won Alfred Bauer Prize. Superstar Meryl Streep was so impressed and complimented Africa for her exceptional performance in the film saying: "There you are! How wonderful to see you in person".

Africa studied Fine Arts and Advertising where she graduated cum laude at the University of Santo Thomas. She is an associate director of Alumni Relations at Asian Institute of Management (AIM). She is also an Associate Editor of AIM's alumni leadership magazine. Before AIM, she was Ballet Philippines’ Corporate Development Director for 16 years.

Career

Beginnings
Africa studied Fine Arts and Advertising where she graduated cum laude at the University of Santo Tomas. She became involved in acting after joining an actors' workshop at the behest of her aunt Odette Marquez, a movie producer, who thought that it would help Africa overcome her shyness. As a young actress, Africa's mentors were Joel Lamangan and Soxie Topacio. She started in the theater in a production of General Goyo (1979) for Bulwagang Gantimpala (now Gantimpala Theater Foundation). Her other plays for Gantimpala include Kanser, Bien Aligtad, Biyaheng Timog, Bongbong at Kris. She has also acted for Teatro Pilipino (“The Importance of Being Ernest”, “Regina Ramos”), Dramatis Personae (“Antigone”) and Dulaang UP (“Juna Luna”) and has been directed by Rolando S. Tinio, Tony Espejo, Joel Lamangan, Anton Juan and Nonon Padilla.

Film and television
She received the Best Supporting Actress at the 1987 Metro Manila Film Festival for her role as Charlie in Olongapo, The Great American Dream. She is also well known for her five-year role as Susan Davis in the long-running teleserye Mara Clara. In 2005, she transferred to rival station, GMA Network, to play a supporting role on Now and Forever: Mukha and took a television break the following year but came back in 2007 through ABS-CBN's Palimos ng Pag-ibig. Africa later did TV5 and Kapamilya shows intermittently in 2011. During 2013, she returned to GMA-7 after Huwag Ka Lang Mawawala and was seen doing Kapuso teleseryes including Prinsesa ng Buhay Ko and Ang Dalawang Mrs. Real. Africa came back to ABS-CBN in late 2014.

Work off camera
Africa worked with Ballet Philippines of the Cultural Center of the Philippines as Corporate Development Manager/Director from 1986 to 2000, and with the Asian Institute of Management (AIM) as Alumni Relations Program Manager/Associate Director from 2000 to 2014.

This 1980 Bb Pilipinas-Universe 1st Runner-up had her 1st one-woman show at Gallery 139, SM Megamall in 2001.

Personal life
Africa is the widow of actor Spanky Manikan. She first met Manikan while acting opposite him in a production of Benjamin Pascual's General Goyo directed by Lamangan in 1979. The couple have three children together: Eli, Miguel, and Mika.

Filmography

Television

Film

Awards and nominations

References

External links
 

1959 births
Living people
Filipino television actresses
Filipino film actresses
University of Santo Tomas alumni
Binibining Pilipinas winners
ABS-CBN personalities
GMA Network personalities
TV5 (Philippine TV network) personalities